Hemilophini is a tribe of longhorn beetles of the subfamily Lamiinae.

Taxonomy

 Abanycha
 Abycendaua
 Acabanga
 Acaiatuca
 Acaiu
 Acapiata
 Acasanga
 Adesmiella
 Adesmoides
 Adesmus
 Alampyris
 Amapanesia
 Apagomera
 Apagomerella
 Apagomerina
 Apeba
 Apebusu
 Apypema
 Arixiuna
 Butocrysa
 Cabreuva
 Cacupira
 Callanga
 Calocosmus
 Camposiellina
 Canarana
 Cariua
 Cathetopteron
 Cendiuna
 Cephalodina
 Chrysaperda
 Cirrhicera
 Clythraschema
 Columbicella
 Corcovado
 Costemilophus
 Cotyabanycha
 Cotyadesmus
 Cotycuara
 Cotysomerida
 Cuicirama
 Cuiciuna
 Dadoychus
 Egalicia
 Endybauna
 Eranina
 Eraninella
 Esamirim
 Essostrutha
 Essostruthella
 Eulachnesia
 Frankluquetia
 Fredlanea
 Gagarinia
 Guayuriba
 Hemierana
 Hemiloapis
 Hemilocrinitus
 Hemilomecopterus
 Hemilophus
 Hilarolea
 Hilaroleopsis
 Iareonycha
 Iarucanga
 Iatuca
 Ibitiruna
 Icaunauna
 Icimauna
 Icupima
 Ipepo
 Iquiara
 Ischnophygas
 Isomerida
 Itaituba
 Ites
 Itumbiara
 Juninia
 Kuatinga
 Kyranycha
 Lamacoscylus
 Lapazina
 Leucophoebe
 Lycaneptia
 Lycidola
 Lycodesmus
 Lycomimus
 Malacoscylus
 Mariliana
 Melzerina
 Mexicoscylus
 Mocoiasura
 Murupeaca
 Neomoema
 Ochromima
 Ocoa
 Oedudes
 Okamira
 Olivensa
 Paleohemilophus
 Parapeba
 Parauna
 Phoebe
 Phoebella
 Phoebemima
 Piampatara
 Piratininga
 Piruanycha
 Porangonycha
 Potiapunga
 Poticuara
 Pseudegalicia
 Purusia
 Purusiella
 Quatiara
 Quirimbaua
 Sibapipunga
 Spathoptera
 Sphallonycha
 Susuanycha
 Sybaguasu
 Tabatinga
 Tetamauara
 Tetanola
 Themistonoe
 Tyrinthia
 Unaporanga
 Woytkowskia
 Zeale

References

 
Beetle tribes
Lamiinae